Waibstadt is a town in the district of Rhein-Neckar-Kreis, in Baden-Württemberg,  Germany.

It belongs to the municipal administration union "Waibstadt", which  consists of Epfenbach, Helmstadt-Bargen, Neckarbischofsheim, Neidenstein, Reichartshausen and Waibstadt itself. Furthermore, it is part of the touristic region Brunnenregion.

Geography

Geographic location
Waibstadt is located in the valley of the Schwarzbach in the northern Kraichgau, about 25 km southeast of Heidelberg and about 6 km north of Sinsheim.

Neighbour municipalities
The town is surrounded in the northwest by Neidenstein, in the north by Epfenbach, in the northeast by Helmstadt-Bargen, in the east by Neckarbischofsheim, in the south by Sinsheim and in the west by Zuzenhausen and Eschelbronn.

Parts of town

Besides the main town Waibstadt, the two villages Daisbach and Bernau are part of Waibstadt.

History

The first documented mentioning date at 795 AD, but there are indications, that at the same place there was a Roman settlement.

References

External links

 Offizielle Internetpräsenz
 Offizielle Internetpräsenz des Ortsteils Daisbach

Rhein-Neckar-Kreis